Granoturris presleyi is a species of sea snail, a marine gastropod mollusk in the family Mangeliidae.

Description
The length of the shell attains 5 mm.

Distribution
G. presleyi can be found in Caribbean waters, off the western coast of Florida.

References

 Lyons, William G. "New Turridae (Gastropoda: Toxoglossa) from south Florida and the eastern Gulf of Mexico." The Nautilus 86.1 (1972): 3–7.

External links
 Rosenberg G., Moretzsohn F. & García E. F. (2009). Gastropoda (Mollusca) of the Gulf of Mexico, Pp. 579–699 in Felder, D.L. and D.K. Camp (eds.), Gulf of Mexico–Origins, Waters, and Biota. Biodiversity. Texas A&M Press, College Station, Texas
  Tucker, J.K. 2004 Catalog of recent and fossil turrids (Mollusca: Gastropoda). Zootaxa 682:1-1295.

presleyi
Gastropods described in 1972